The Peace of Amasya ( ("Peymān-e Amasiyeh")) was a treaty agreed to on May 29, 1555, between Shah Tahmasp of Safavid Iran and Sultan Suleiman the Magnificent of the Ottoman Empire at the city of Amasya, following the Ottoman–Safavid War of 1532–1555.

Overview
The treaty defined the border between Iran and the Ottoman Empire and was followed by twenty years of peace. By this treaty, Armenia and Georgia were divided equally between the two, with Western Armenia, western Kurdistan, and western Georgia (incl. western Samtskhe) falling in Ottoman hands while Eastern Armenia, eastern Kurdistan, and eastern Georgia (incl. eastern Samtskhe) stayed in Iranian hands. The Ottoman Empire obtained most of Iraq, including Baghdad, which gave them access to the Persian Gulf, while the Persians retained their former capital Tabriz and all their other northwestern territories in the Caucasus and as they were prior to the wars, such as Dagestan and all of what is now Azerbaijan. The frontier thus established ran across the mountains dividing eastern and western Georgia (under native vassal princes), through Armenia, and via the western slopes of the Zagros down to the Persian Gulf.

Several buffer zones were established as well throughout Eastern Anatolia, such as in Erzurum, Shahrizor, and Van. Kars was declared neutral, and its existing fortress was destroyed.

The Ottomans, further, guaranteed access for Persian pilgrims to go to the Muslim holy cities of Mecca and Medina as well as to the Shia holy sites of pilgrimages in Iraq.

The decisive parting of the Caucasus and the irrevocable ceding of Mesopotamia to the Ottomans happened per the next major peace treaty known as the Treaty of Zuhab in 1639 CE/AD.

Another term of the treaty was that the Safavids were required to end the ritual cursing of the first three Rashidun Caliphs, Aisha and other Sahaba (companions of Muhammad) — all held in high esteem by Sunnis. This condition was a common demand of Ottoman-Safavid treaties, and in this case was considered humiliating for Tahmasp.

References

Further reading
 
 
 
 

Peace treaties of Iran
Amasya
Treaties of the Safavid dynasty
1555 in the Ottoman Empire
1555 treaties
Kartli
Kakheti
Kingdom of Kartli-Kakheti
Partition (politics)
History of Amasya
History of Dagestan
Ottoman Iraq
16th century in Armenia
16th century in Azerbaijan
16th century in Georgia (country)
16th century in Iran
Suleiman the Magnificent
Iran–Turkey relations
Ottoman–Persian Wars
Iran–Ottoman Empire treaties